The second-generation iPod Touch (marketed as "the new iPod touch", and colloquially known as the iPod Touch 2G, iPod Touch 2, or iPod 2) is a multi-touch mobile device designed and marketed by Apple Inc. with a touchscreen-based user interface. The successor to the 1st-generation iPod Touch, it was unveiled and released at Apple's media event on September 9, 2008. It is compatible with up to iOS 4.2.1, which was released on November 22, 2010.

History 
The second-generation iPod Touch was only sold in 8GB, 16GB and 32GB models. Two revisions of the device exist, one with an old bootROM exploitable with steaks4ce with a larger device capacity label on the back. In late 2009, Apple introduced a revised version of the second-gen iPod touch under the MC model name, which was only available in an 8GB variant. It featured a newer bootROM version which patched the steaks4ce bootROM exploit and has a smaller device capacity label similar to that of the iPod touch 3rd gen.

Features

Software 

 
It fully supports iPhone OS 3 but has limited support for iOS 4 and did not get support for home screen wallpapers, multitasking, or Game Center, and it never received iOS 4.3.

References 

iPod